The All-Ireland Senior Hurling Championship of 1944 was the 58th staging of Ireland's premier hurling knock-out competition. Cork won the championship, beating Dublin 2-13 to 1-2 in the final at Croke Park, Dublin.

Pre-championship

Four-in-a-row

Coming into the 1944 championship Cork were presented with a chance to achieve something that had never been done before.  Having captured their third All-Ireland title in-a-row the previous year, Cork's hurlers were primed to go one better and secure an unprecedented fourth successive All-Ireland title.  The 'four-in-a-row' had already been captured by the footballers of Wexford (1915–18) and Kerry (1929–32), however, no hurling team had ever bested three-in-a-row.  That feat had been achieved several times before with Cork, Tipperary and Kilkenny all claiming famous trebles.  None of those teams, however, reached a fourth successive All-Ireland final as they were all beaten in the provincial series of games.

The championship

Format

Leinster Championship

First round: (2 matches) These are two lone matches between the first four teams drawn from the province of Leinster.  Two teams are eliminated at this stage, while the two winners advance to the semi-finals.

Semi-finals: (2 matches) The winners of the two first round games join the other two Leinster teams to make up the semi-final pairings.  Two teams are eliminated at this stage, while the two winners advance to the final.

Final: (1 match) The winners of the two semi-finals contest this game.  One team is eliminated at this stage, while the winners advance to the All-Ireland semi-final.

Munster Championship

First round: (1 match) This is a lone match between the first two teams drawn from the province of Munster.  One team is  eliminated at this stage, while the winners advance to the semi-finals.

Semi-finals: (2 matches) The winners of the first round game join the other three Munster teams to make up the semi-final pairings.  Two teams are eliminated at this stage, while the two winners advance to the final.

Final: (1 match) The winners of the two semi-finals contest this game.  One team is eliminated at this stage, while the winners advance to the All-Ireland semi-final.

Ulster Championship

Semi-finals: (2 matches) The four Ulster teams are drawn against each other in two semi-finals. Two teams are eliminated at this stage, while the two winners advance to the final.

Final: (1 match) The winners of the two semi-finals contest this game.  One team is eliminated at this stage, while the winners advance to the All-Ireland semi-final.

All-Ireland Championship

Semi-finals: (2 matches) The Munster and Leinster champions are paired in opposite semi-finals while Galway enter the championship at this stage.  The emi-final pairings are Munster champions versus Galway and Leinster champions versus Ulster champions.  Two teams are eliminated at this stage, while the two winners advance to the All-Ireland final.

Final: (1 match) The two semi-final winners will contest the All-Ireland final.

Fixtures

Leinster Senior Hurling Championship

Munster Senior Hurling Championship

Ulster Senior Hurling Championship

All-Ireland Senior Hurling Championship

Championship statistics

Scoring

Widest winning margin: 30 points
Dublin 10-7 : 1-4 Offaly (Leinster semi-final)
Most goals in a match: 11
Dublin 10-7 : 1-4 Offaly (Leinster semi-final)
Antrim 5-7 : 6-4 Monaghan (Ulster final)
Most points in a match: 21
Dublin 6-10 : 1-11 Meath (Leinster first round)
Most goals by one team in a match: 10
Dublin 10-7 : 1-4 Offaly (Leinster semi-final)
Most goals scored by a losing team: 5
Westmeath 5-3 : 5-5 Offaly (Leinster first round)
Most points scored by a losing team: 11
Meath 1-11 : 6-10 Dublin (Leinster first round)

Miscellaneous

 The Munster final went to a replay for the first time since 1940.  On that occasion both Cork and Limerick were also the two teams involved.  Limerick won the replay on that occasion.
 For the first time since 1938 a team other than Kilkenny or Dublin qualified for the Leinster final.  Wexford's first victory against Kilkenny since 1906 ensured the county appeared in the provincial decider for the first time since 1916.
 This was Monaghan's first appearance in the Ulster final since 1916.  The team last won the provincial decider in 1915.
 The Ulster final went to a replay for the first time since 1914.  On that occasion Antrim and Monaghan were also the teams involved.  Monaghan won the replay on that occasion.
 A Munster team captured the All-Ireland title for a fifth consecutive season.
 Cork became the first team to win four All-Ireland titles in a row.  Nine players from the team contributed to all four final victories.  This record stood until 2009 when Kilkenny equalled the feat with their own four-in-a-row.

Player facts

Debutantes
The following players made their début in the 1944 championship:

Retirees
The following players played their last game in the 1944 championship:

Bibliography
 Corry, Eoghan, The GAA Book of Lists (Hodder Headline Ireland, 2005).
 Donegan, Des, The Complete Handbook of Gaelic Games (DBA Publications Limited, 2005).
 Sweeney, Éamonn, Munster Hurling Legends (The O'Brien Press, 2002).

See also

1944
All-Ireland Senior Hurling Championship